HS4000 Kestrel was a prototype high-powered mainline diesel locomotive that was built in 1967 by Brush Traction, Loughborough, as a technology demonstrator for potential future British Rail and export orders. The locomotive number is a combination of the initials of Hawker Siddeley (the owners of Brush Traction) and the power rating of its Sulzer diesel engine (4,000 hp), making it the most powerful locomotive built by the company.

It was painted in a livery of yellow ochre with a broad chocolate-brown band around the lower bodyside separated by a thin white line running around the body.

Background and design
Brush Electric Engineering Ltd. (Brush Traction) in association with Sulzer Brothers Ltd. responded with a  locomotive for British Rail's appraisal. The body, exterior details, control console, and colours were designed by E.G. M. Wilkes of "Wilkes & Ward" (later Wilkes & Ashmore, industrial design firm based on Horsham, West Sussex). The design principle was that a single engine would require less maintenance than twin-engined vehicles, and that the very high power would mean that double heading for freight trains would be unnecessary.

Diesel engine
Brush employed Sulzer's 16-cylinder Vee 16LVA24 engine made in Winterthur.

The engine is a four-stroke turbocharged oil-cooled design, with the oil being cooled by water in a heat exchanger, and the water cooled in radiators. The piston diameter is 240 mm with a stroke 280 mm.

A smaller auxiliary generator (~40 kW) was used to charge the batteries or start the engine etc.

Electrical transmission and auxiliary electrical system
To transmit this power to the rail Brush utilised a brushless salient pole three phase alternator connected to a rectifying circuit of 84 silicon diodes producing ~2,500 kW of power for electric traction from the diesel engine. An auxiliary alternator, also brushless and producing three phase electrical power gave ~500 kW for electrical train heating, and also supplied power to electrical fans etc. in the locomotive. The armatures/rotors for both alternators were electrically energised by DC produced by the rectified output of brushless alternators.

Each of the 6 axles was powered by an individual traction motor which was a four pole force ventilated type. Connection of the axle to the motor was via a reduction gear (giving  top speed), then through a flexible hollow shaft drive to the axle.

The fans (blowers) to cool the traction motors and engine radiators were of the three phase asynchronous type, the motors driving the compressors, pumps, fans for the dynamic (resistive) brake etc. were DC motors.

Braking system
Locomotive braking was by vacuum, air (high pressure) or dynamic (electrical regenerative resistive braking), the dynamic brakes were preferentially used at high speeds, with the air brake being activated at lower speeds where dynamic braking was less effective; speed sensors automatically determined the braking type to be used. Additionally a hydraulically activated parking brake was fitted.

Electronic devices
Plug-in solid state modules were used for voltage and power control including monitoring wheelslip and monitoring engine temperature.

Superstructure construction
A Warren truss body construction with welded, stressed steel skin was used on the sides of the locomotive which supported the transverse load of the main engine entirely.

Bogies
The bogie side frames were of one piece cast construction with coil spring suspension, connected by 4 transverse members; two internal and two at either end

After the Hither Green rail crash, British Rail issued a directive that all locomotives should have an axle weight of no-more than 21 tons. In an attempt to comply with this, Brush fitted the locomotive with modified British Rail Class 47 bogies. The lighter construction and traction motors helped but the attempt was ultimately unsuccessful leaving Kestrel at 22.5 tons per axle. Kestrel continued to be used but the axle-weight problem contributed to the decision to sell the locomotive and prior to this, in March 1971, the original bogies were refitted.

Cabs

The driver's cab is attached to the frame below by rubber fittings. Driver controls were similar to that of Class 47.

Career

British Rail
Construction of the locomotive (Brush works No. 711 of 1967) started in 1966 and was complete by 1967. However the locomotive was considerably over the 20t axle-load limit specified by British Rail for its procurement requirements. The locomotive was officially handed over to BR on 29 January 1968 at Marylebone Station. Test runs were performed with both passenger and freight stock; the locomotive was primarily used to haul heavy freight trains - including a coal train of over 2000t weight - the locomotive achieved an 88% availability figure after .

Following the fitting of its new bogies the locomotive was used on express passenger trains. On a London King's Cross to Newcastle service diagrammed for British Rail Class 55 ('Deltic') operation the unit was 14mins faster than required even though the new traction motors meant reduced power at the rail.

In March 1971 it was withdrawn from service in the UK and sent back to Brush for refitting.

Sale to Soviet Union
The locomotive was sold to the Soviet Union in 1971 for £127,000, being shipped from Cardiff Docks to Leningrad docks by the MV Krasnokamsk in July 1971.

After testing of the locomotive the engine was removed for static testing, and the locomotive body ballasted for use in high load tests of other vehicles.

The remains of the vehicle are believed to have been scrapped in 1993.

Conclusions

United Kingdom
The locomotive did not result in any further orders.

Russia
Some of the observations of Russian railway engineers relate to different practices between Russian and British locomotive design, specifically:
 Due to the smaller loading gauges in Great Britain, the cab windows were set too low for signals to be seen if the driver is standing.
 The passages were too narrow.
 The bogies were considered overly large.
 The requirement to sling the engine and compressor below the main frame was considered unusual.
 The stressed skin construction was noted as being not suitable due to corrosion increasing the susceptibility to structural weakening, as the load-bearing skin is thin and point welded.

The axle bearings, traction transmission and spherical rubber metal joints in the suspension were considered of interest.

Developments
Some of the HS4000's technology was used to form the basis of, or improvements in, subsequent locomotives built in the Soviet Union.

Models
HS4000 "Kestrel" is made as a kit and ready-to-run in OO gauge by Silver Fox Models.

Heljan of Denmark have produced a highly detailed OO scale model of the Kestrel, as part of a limited run of 4000 units.

The Swanley New Barn Railway, in Swanley, Kent, operates a 7 1/4 inch gauge overscale version of the 'kestrel' which was built by Mardyke Miniature Railways. Unlike the full size, this model is a diesel-hydraulic.

References and notes

Notes

References

Sources

Further reading

External links

  Photograph of HS4000 in Russia in a bad state of repair, still in Hawker Siddeley livery.

HS4000
Brush Traction locomotives
Co-Co locomotives
Experimental locomotives
Soviet Union–United Kingdom relations
Railway locomotives introduced in 1968
Standard gauge locomotives of Great Britain
5 ft gauge locomotives
Diesel-electric locomotives of Great Britain
Diesel-electric locomotives of the Soviet Union
Scrapped locomotives